Popovka is a rural locality (a selo) in Shebekinsky District, Belgorod Oblast, Russia. The population was 510 as of 2010. There is 1 street.

Geography 
Popovka is located 53 km northeast of Shebekino (the district's administrative centre) by road. Bershakovo is the nearest rural locality.

References 

Rural localities in Shebekinsky District